Ladislav Jan Šaloun (1 August 1870, Prague – 18 October 1946, Prague) was a prominent Czech sculptor of the Art Nouveau period.

Life

Šaloun was born in 1870 in Prague and he studied in the studios of Tomáš Seidan and Bohuslav Schnirch. He was involved as an artist in the Mánes Union of Fine Arts. This independent education allowed him to avoid the influence of Josef Václav Myslbek, looking instead to the work of Auguste Rodin.  He was later admitted to the prestigious Czech Academy of Sciences in 1912 but never took training there.  In 1927 he was appointed the civic artistic advisor for the city of Prague in 1927, and in 1946 was honored by being named a National Artist.

Šaloun worked on his Jan Hus Memorial on the Old Town Square in Prague for 15 years, from 1901 through 1915. During this time this commission required a much larger studio so he designed Šaloun's Villa where he lived and entertained. This house in Vinohrady is one of the outstanding proto-modernist buildings of its Prague district. He also produced similar Hus monuments for the towns of Hořice (1911–1913) and Libáň (1925).  His architectural sculpture for the Municipal House, finished in 1911, is one example of his collaborations with Czech architect Osvald Polívka.

According to Cannon-Brooks, "From the beginning he was extremely prolific and his exceptional facility... led on occasion to a certain superficiality, for which he has been over-criticized."

Šaloun is buried in the Vyšehrad cemetery, not far from his bust of Antonín Dvořák marking the composer's grave.

Architectural sculptures 
 Hlahol Building, Prague, with architect Josef Fanta, 1903–1906
 Hotel Europa, Wenceslas Square, Prague, with architect Alois Dryák for the 1905 redesign
 New Town Hall, Prague, with Osvald Polívka, 1908–1911
 Municipal House, Prague, with Polívka, circa 1912
 allegorical Art Nouveau statues flanking the entrance to the Gallery of Modern Art in Hradec Králové, representing Trade and Harvest (the building was originally a credit institution), with Polívka
 many other apartment houses and other buildings including Šaloun's Villa.

References

Further reading
 František Šmejkal, "Secesně - symbolistní tvorba Ladislava Šalouna" (Art Nouveau-Symbolist Works by Šaloun), in: Umění #28, 1980
 Antonie Urbanová-Santholzerová: "O Ladislavu Šalounovi", in: Dílo XXX, 1939–1940, pg.68
 Rudolf Rouček, "Dílo Ladislava Šalouna", in: Dílo XXX, 1939–1940, pg. 178
 Lev Uhlíř: Ladislav Šaloun a jeho dílo, České Grafické Unie, 1930
 Ladislav Šaloun, "Moje Husovy pomníky" (My Hus Monuments), in: Dílo, #18, 1924-1925

External links 

 Works by and about Šaloun @ the National Library of the Czech Republic
 "Kamenná díla sochaře Ladislava Šalouna" (Stone works by Šaloun) @ Kámen
 Biographical notes and works @ AbART

1870 births
1946 deaths
Artists from Prague
People from the Kingdom of Bohemia
Czech architectural sculptors
Czech sculptors
Czech male sculptors
Art Nouveau sculptors
20th-century sculptors
Burials at Vyšehrad Cemetery